"PTSD" is a song by American rapper G Herbo featuring fellow American rappers Juice Wrld, Lil Uzi Vert, and Chance the Rapper. It was released on February 28, 2020, from G Herbo's third studio album of the same name (2020). The song was produced by D.A. Got That Dope. It peaked at number 38 on the Billboard Hot 100, becoming G Herbo's first and highest-charting song.

Background
In an interview with Rolling Stone, G Herbo described the song's collaboration as "natural", further stating, "I was hounding him — I had to make sure Juice recorded the hook. Once he recorded the hook, we knew we had a smash. Then Chance came naturally and Uzi as well. Everybody recorded their part right in front of me."

"PTSD" is Juice Wrld's second posthumous release, following his feature on Eminem's "Godzilla".

Composition
The song is about the trauma which the rappers have experienced and its effects, such as mental health issues, and features an "eerie" guitar-driven instrumental with "bubbly drums". It opens with the chorus, sung by Juice Wrld: "I turn the news on, when I smell death in the air / I prove you wrong, I made it out of here". G Herbo reflects on his own experience of seeing his friends die. Next, Chance the Rapper details witnessing shootings, murder (including that of his mother), and robbery, while Lil Uzi Vert touches on their paranoia as a result of PTSD.

Critical reception
The song received generally positive reviews. Critics have praised Juice Wrld's singing of the chorus and described it as sounding even more sadder given his death in December 2019. Fred Thomas called it a "mesmerizing melodic hook". Mitch Findlay of HotNewHipHop praised the production of the song, calling it "melancholic yet hopeful". In a HipHopDX review of PTSD, Josh Svetz regarded Lil Uzi Vert's verse as unnecessary and writing that it "takes away from the sentiment of the song, spitting vapid and on the nose bars devoid of detail." However, Svetz went on to comment, "Despite Uzi having another 'Bad and Boujee' moment, the track is one of Herbo's greatest triumphs, a collaboration that serves as the heart of the record."

Live performances
On November 16, 2020, G Herbo and Chance the Rapper performed the song on The Tonight Show Starring Jimmy Fallon, as a tribute to Juice Wrld.

Charts

Certifications

References

2020 songs
G Herbo songs
Juice Wrld songs
Chance the Rapper songs
Lil Uzi Vert songs
Songs about anxiety
Songs about depression
Songs released posthumously
Songs written by Juice Wrld
Songs written by Chance the Rapper
Songs written by Lil Uzi Vert
Songs written by D.A. Got That Dope
Posse cuts